Il raccomandato di ferro is a 1959 Italian comedy film directed by Marcello Baldi   and starring  Mario Riva.  It grossed 89,3 million lire at the Italian box office.

Plot 
Augusto Zinconi is a former Roman usher who found employment in an oil industry in Mestre thanks to a false letter of recommendation from Undersecretary Goffredo Monaci. Laggard and libertine, after bribing the doorkeeper of the plant to get his card stamped in his absence, he manages to escape dismissal by claiming to be a longtime friend of the undersecretary, who has meanwhile become a powerful minister, the only person who could save the industry from bankruptcy. He was then sent to Rome to have the important file signed by the minister; helped by luck, he manages to obtain the document, already signed previously, without meeting Monaci. Returning to Mestre as a triumph, he obtained new and greater positions, until one day the minister's visit to the industry was announced, putting Zinconi and Monaci in front of each other for the first time.

Cast 
 Mario Riva as Augusto Zinconi
 Franca Marzi as  Fedora
 Alessandra Panaro as  Wilma
 Aroldo Tieri as "Penombra"
 Edy Vessel as Miss Jane 
  Augusto Gotti Lega as The General Director
 Roberto Risso as  Massimo Conte
 Amedeo Nazzari as Minister Monaci 
 Enzo Garinei as  Mingotto
 Tiberio Murgia as  Nicola 
 Carlo Pisacane as  Luigi  
 Alberto Rabagliati as The Milanese Businessman
  Ileana Ghione  	
 Ignazio Leone 	 
 Toni Ucci
 Nietta Zocchi

References

External links

Italian comedy films
1959 comedy films
1959 films
Films directed by Marcello Baldi
Films set in Rome
Films set in Venice
Italian black-and-white films
1950s Italian films